Martin Baker (born 8 June 1974 in Govan) is a Scottish former footballer who played as a left back for St Mirren, Kilmarnock and Pollok.

During his time with Kilmarnock he was at the centre of controversy during which he was snubbed by manager Bobby Williamson to participate in the 2001 Scottish League Cup Final which Kilmarnock lost to Celtic three goals to nil thanks to a hat-trick from Henrik Larsson. He later went on to reveal that he was close to confronting and lashing out at Williamson.

He represented his country at the 1996 UEFA European Under-21 Football Championship where Scotland reached the semi-final stage before being knocked out by Spain.

References

External links
 Profile at 11v11.com
 

1974 births
Living people
People from Govan
Footballers from Glasgow
Association football fullbacks
Scottish footballers
Scotland under-21 international footballers
St Mirren F.C. players
Kilmarnock F.C. players
Scottish Football League players
Scottish Premier League players
Pollok F.C. players
Maryhill F.C. players